Lowell A. Reed Jr. (June 21, 1930 – April 11, 2020) was a United States district judge of the United States District Court for the Eastern District of Pennsylvania.

Education and career

Born in West Chester, Pennsylvania, Reed received a Bachelor of Business Administration degree from the University of Wisconsin in 1952 and attended the University of Wisconsin Law School before receiving a Juris Doctor from Temple University Beasley School of Law in 1958. He was in the United States Navy as a Lieutenant Commander of Naval Intelligence from 1953 to 1957. He was a law clerk for Judge Ethan Allen Doty of the Court of Common Pleas in Philadelphia, Pennsylvania in 1958. He was a corporation trial counsel for the PMA Insurance Group in Philadelphia from 1958 to 1962. He was in private practice in Philadelphia from 1963 to 1988. He was a lecturer in law at the Temple University Beasley School of Law from 1966 to 1981. He was on the faculty advisory board of The Academy of Advocacy at Temple University, from 1989 to 2020.

Other service

Prior to being appointed to the bench, Reed was elected to serve on the Abington School District Board of School Directors and was president of the Rydal-Meadowbrook Civic Association. He has also served as an elder of the Abington Presbyterian Church.

Federal judicial service

Reed was nominated by President Ronald Reagan on December 18, 1987, to a seat on the United States District Court for the Eastern District of Pennsylvania vacated by Judge Anthony Joseph Scirica. He was confirmed by the United States Senate on April 19, 1988, and received his commission on April 20, 1988. He assumed senior status on June 21, 1999. He died on April 11, 2020, of complications from Parkinson's disease. He was 89 years old.

References

Sources
 

1930 births
2020 deaths
20th-century American judges
21st-century American judges
Deaths from Parkinson's disease
Neurological disease deaths in Pennsylvania
Judges of the United States District Court for the Eastern District of Pennsylvania
People from West Chester, Pennsylvania
School board members in Pennsylvania
Temple University Beasley School of Law alumni
Temple University faculty
United States district court judges appointed by Ronald Reagan
United States Navy officers
Wisconsin School of Business alumni
University of Wisconsin Law School alumni